The name Louise has been used for eleven tropical cyclones worldwide, ten in the Western Pacific Ocean and one in the South-West Indian Ocean.

In the Western Pacific:

 Typhoon Louise (1945), struck Japan
 Typhoon Louise (1951) (T5109), Category 4 typhoon
 Typhoon Louise (1955) (T5522), struck Japan. 54 people were killed and 14 were missing.
 Typhoon Louise (1959) (T5911, 22W), struck Taiwan and China
 Typhoon Louise (1962) (T6207, 45W), struck Japan
 Typhoon Louise–Marge (1964) (T6431, 46W, Ining), struck the Philippines
 Tropical Storm Louise (1967) (T6718, 19W), struck Japan
 Typhoon Louise (1970) (T7021, 23W)
 Typhoon Louise (1973) (T7313, 15W, Huling)
 Typhoon Louise (1976) (T7622, 23W)

In the South-West Indian:

 Cyclone Louise (1970)

Pacific typhoon set index articles
South-West Indian Ocean cyclone set index articles